Lao is a settlement in Trashiyangtse District in eastern Bhutan.

References

External links
Satellite map at Maplandia.com

Populated places in Bhutan